Charles Camsell  (February 8, 1876 – December 19, 1958) was a Canadian geologist and the commissioner of the Northwest Territories from December 3, 1936 to December 3, 1946.

Early life

He was born in 1876 in Fort Liard, Northwest Territories, the son of a Hudson's Bay Company factor, Julian Stuart Camsell and Métis woman, Sarah Foulds.  In 1894, he earned a Bachelor of Arts in Natural Science at the University of Manitoba. Following graduation, he returned to the north where he and his brother caught gold rush fever and set out to stake a claim in Yukon. It was at this time that he developed an interest in geology and exploration.

Career with the public service of Canada

Camsell had a long and outstanding career with the Public Service of Canada commencing in 1904.

In 1920, he was appointed Deputy Minister of Mines and, in 1936, Deputy Minister of Mines and Resources.

He retired from the Public Service of Canada in 1946 at the age of 70.

Other contributions and recognition

From 1930 to 1931 Camsell was President of the Royal Society of Canada.  The Royal Society of Canada is the senior national body of distinguished Canadian scientists and scholars. Its primary objective is to promote learning and research in the natural and social sciences and in the humanities.

From 1941 Camsell was an original standing committee member of the Foundation for the Study of Cycles. The Foundation for the Study of Cycles  is an international non-profit research organisation for the study of cycles of events.

Camsell founded the Canadian Geographical Society (now the Royal Canadian Geographical Society) in 1929, and was its president from 1930 to 1941. The Royal Canadian Geographical Society is a Canadian non-profit educational organization dedicated to imparting a broader knowledge and deeper appreciation of Canada — its people and places, its natural and cultural heritage and its environmental, social and economic challenges. The Society is the publisher of Canadian Geographic magazine and its French-language counterpart Géographica.

In 1935 Camsell was made Companion of the Order of St Michael and St George by King George V. In 1945 the Royal Geographical Society of London awarded him their Founder's Medal for his contributions to geology.

The Charles Camsell Hospital, opened in Edmonton in 1946, was named after Camsell.

Archives
There is a Charles Camsell fonds at Library and Archives Canada. Archival reference number is R1528.

References

External links
 
Biography of Charles Camsell
Lieutenant Governors and Commissioners
1939 Charles Camsell’s Fort Simpson NWT Historical Timeline, Prince of Wales Northern Heritage Centre

1876 births
1958 deaths
Canadian Companions of the Order of St Michael and St George
Commissioners of the Northwest Territories
Geological Survey of Canada personnel
Persons of National Historic Significance (Canada)
Royal Canadian Geographical Society